Klösterle may refer to:
Klášterec nad Ohří, a town in the Czech Republic known in German as Klösterle an der Eger
Klášterec nad Orlicí, a village in the Czech Republic known in German as Klösterle an der Adler
Klösterle, Austria, a town in the district of Bludenz in Vorarlberg in Austria